Mk22 may refer to:

Military
Barrett MRAD adopted as the Mk 22 Advanced Sniper Rifle by the U.S. military
Mark 22 nuclear bomb, United States thermonuclear test
Mark 22 torpedo, United States prototype torpedo
Smith & Wesson Model 39 pistol formerly used by the United States Naval Special Warfare Command as the Mk 22 Mod 0

Other uses
M.K. 22 an Israeli animated sitcom